Uma-Snehrashmi Prize, also known as Uma-Snehrashmi Paritoshik is a literary award in Gujarat, India founded by Snehrashmi in 1963 in a remembrance of his deceased daughter Uma. Presented by Gujarati Sahitya Parishad, the award has been conferred every two years to the author of the most outstanding book in Gujarati language.

Recipients 
The Uma-Snehrashmi Prize has been granted every two years, since 1963, to the following people:

References

Awards established in 1963
Gujarati literary awards
1963 establishments in Gujarat